Grace Gore Sturdivant, AuD is an American beauty pageant titleholder who was named Miss Tennessee 2007 and Miss Mississippi Teen USA 2002.

Biography
She is a doctor of audiology and the founder and president of Graceful Sounds, Inc., a nonprofit organization that provides audiology services and hearing aids to children in need.  She has been an assistant professor of audiologist at The University of Mississippi Medical Center.

References 

American beauty pageant winners
Miss America 2008 delegates
Miss Tennessee winners
Living people
Year of birth missing (living people)